Duma is a genus of shrubby flowering plants in the family Polygonaceae, subfamily Polygonoideae. The genus was separated from Muehlenbeckia in 2011. The native range of the genus is Australia.

Description
Species of Duma are shrubs, with many flexible branches, whose tips are thornlike. They have white to greyish bark. The leaves are longer than wide, with a very small curved spine at the tip. The flowers are without stalks (petioles). Plants are dioecious. Staminate flowers have eight stamens and a rudimentary or missing pistil; pistillate flowers have staminodes. The fruit is in the form of an ovoid or three-angled achene, which is smooth and shiny.

Taxonomy
The genus Duma was created by Tanja Schuster in 2011 for some species previously placed in Muehlenbeckia, but which were shown by molecular phylogenetic studies to form a distinct clade. The name is derived from the Latin for "thorn-bush". Duma is placed in the tribe Polygoneae of the subfamily Polygonoideae. Within the tribe, it is most closely related to the genera Atraphaxis and Polygonum, forming the so-called "DAP clade", and is not so closely related to Muehlenbeckia.

Species
, three species were accepted by Plants of the World Online:
Duma coccoloboides (J.M.Black) T.M.Schust. (syn. Muehlenbeckia coccoloboides)
Duma florulenta (Meisn.) T.M.Schust. (syn. Muehlenbeckia florulenta)
Duma horrida (H.Gross) T.M.Schust. (syn. Muehlenbeckia horrida)

References

Polygonoideae
Polygonaceae genera
Dioecious plants